Back in the Game is an American sitcom about a newly divorced single mother who has to move back home to live with her ex-minor league baseball manager father.  It aired from September 25, 2013, to February 23, 2014, on ABC. The series stars James Caan and Maggie Lawson and aired during the 2013–14 American television season as a Wednesday night entry. Back in the Game was co-created and executive-produced by brothers Mark and Robb Cullen for 20th Century Fox Television. The series was green-lit by ABC for a series order pickup on May 10, 2013.

On November 1, 2013, ABC announced it was cancelling Back in the Game. Following its tenth aired episode, ABC pulled the series from its schedule and left three episodes unaired.
On February 23, 2014, the remaining episodes were released on iTunes, Amazon and other streaming services.

Cast
 Maggie Lawson as Terry Gannon, Jr.
 James Caan as Terry "The Cannon" Gannon, Sr.
 Griffin Gluck as Danny Gannon
 Ben Koldyke as Dick Slingbaugh
 Lenora Crichlow as Gigi Fernandez-Lovette
 Cooper Roth as David Slingbaugh
 Josie Totah as Michael Lovette
 Kennedy Waite as Vanessa
 Brandon Selgado-Telis as Dudley Douglas
 Matthew Zhang as Dong Jing

Episodes

Broadcast
In Canada, City simulcast the ABC broadcast, which debuted on the same day as the American broadcast. In Australia, the series aired on the Nine Network, and debuted on April 9, 2014, where it was originally advertised under the title Mum (the spelling of 'Mom' in Australian English) but later reverted to the original title. In India the show airs on STAR World Premiere HD. In New Zealand, the series premiered on TV2 in 2014. In the United Kingdom, the series premiered on ITV2 on January 20, 2014. The series will be syndicated on TBS on August 25, 2014.

Reception
Kristin Dos Santos of E! Online said that while the show's writing and casting was good, the premise might not be original enough to score a big audience. Robert Bianco of USA Today gave the show 3 out of 4 stars. David Hinckley of the New York Daily News gave the show 2 out of 5 stars. Mary McNamara of the Los Angeles Times said Caan "owns the screen whenever he's on it," Lawson "holds her own," and  Crichlow and Gluck's characters were "a delight."

Notes

References

External links
 

2010s American single-camera sitcoms
2013 American television series debuts
2013 American television series endings
American sports television series
American Broadcasting Company original programming
Baseball television series
English-language television shows
Television series by 20th Century Fox Television
Television shows set in Los Angeles
Television series by Kapital Entertainment